The following are the football (soccer) events of the year 1940 throughout the world.

Events
 14 October – Honduran club C.D.S. Vida is established.

Winners club national championship 
 Argentina: Boca Juniors
 Chile: Universidad de Chile
 Germany: FC Schalke 04
 Italy: Internazionale Milano F.C.
 Netherlands: Feyenoord Rotterdam
 Scotland
Scottish Cup: No competition
 Spain:Athletic Aviación
 Romania: Venus București
 Turkey: Fenerbahçe, Eskişehir Demirspor

Births 
 January 5 – Hans Eijkenbroek, Dutch international footballer and manager
 January 20 – Erik Dyreborg, Danish international footballer (died 2013)
 January 23 – Werner Krämer, German international footballer (died 2010)
 January 24 – Brian Labone, English international footballer (died 2006)
 January 25 – Jürgen Sundermann, German international footballer and manager
 February 24 – Wolfgang Solz, German international footballer (died 2017)
 March 5 – Josef Piontek, German international footballer, manager and trainer of the Danish National Team
 March 28 – Luis Cubilla, Uruguayan footballer and manager (died 2013)
 May 3 – Clemens Westerhof, Dutch football manager
 May 10 – Vicente Miera, Spanish football manager
 May 19 – Frans Bouwmeester, Dutch international footballer
 June 2 – Gordon Harris, English international footballer (died 2014)
 July 26 – Jürgen Kurbjuhn, German international footballer (died 2014)
 October 4 – Silvio Marzolini, Argentine international footballer (died 2020)
 October 17 – Harry Heijnen, Dutch international footballer (died 2015)
 October 23 –  Edson Arantes do Nascimento "Pelé", Brazilian international footballer
 November 25 – Jan Jongbloed, Dutch footballer and coach

Deaths
 October 19 - Umberto Caligaris, Italian defender, winner of the 1934 FIFA World Cup, most capped player for Italy from 1932 until 1971 and active manager of Juventus F.C.  (39; aneurysm)

References

 
Association football by year